The list of ship commissionings in 1913 includes a chronological list of ships commissioned in 1913.


1913
 Ship commissionings